Deivathin Deivam is 1962 Indian Tamil-language drama film, written and directed by K. S. Gopalakrishnan. The film stars S. S. Rajendran, C. R. Vijayakumari,  Geetanjali (credited as Manimala) and S. V. Ranga Rao, with music composed by G. Ramanathan. It is based on by the short story Jadam by Bilahari. The film was released on 28 December 1962, and emerged a commercial success

Plot

Cast 
 S. S. Rajendran as Babu
 C. R. Vijayakumari as Kanmani
 Manimala as Annam
 S. V. Ranga Rao as Kanmani's father
 T. K. Balachandran as Kanmani’s brother
 Nagesh
 Manorama

Production 
Deivathin Deivam is based on by the short story Jadam by Bilahari that was published in the magazine Ananda Vikatan.

Soundtrack 
Music by was G. Ramanathan and lyrics were written by Subramania Bharati, Kannadasan, A. Maruthakasi, Panchu Arunachalam, Ra. Pazhanisamy and Ku. Ma. Balasubramaniam. The song "Kannan Mananilayai" is a ragamalika, the first raga name being Abheri. The song "Kannanum Driver-um Onnu" was released only on gramophone record. This was Ramanathan's last completed film.

Release and reception 
Deivathin Deivam was released on 28 December 1962, and emerged a commercial success. Kanthan of Kalki praised the film for the cast performances and cinematography.

References

External links 
 

1960s Tamil-language films
1962 drama films
1962 films
Films about Indian weddings
Films about widowhood in India
Films about women in India
Films based on short fiction
Films directed by K. S. Gopalakrishnan
Films scored by G. Ramanathan
Films with screenplays by K. S. Gopalakrishnan
Indian black-and-white films
Indian drama films